Kalaj Darg (also Romanized as Kalāj Darg, Kalai Darak, Kalājderk, Kalazh Dark, and Kelājdarg; also known as Qal‘eh-ye Darak) is a village in Alqurat Rural District, in the Central District of Birjand County, South Khorasan Province, Iran. At the 2006 census, its population was 10, in 5 families.

References 

Populated places in Birjand County